"The Bitch in Yoo" is a single and diss song released by rapper Common in 1996. The song first appeared on the Relativity Records compilation Relativity Urban Assault and later on Roc Raida's Crossfaderz. It was also performed live alongside De La Soul on their album Live at Tramps, NYC, 1996. The b-side of "The Bitch in Yoo" is "The Real Weight", a solo track by No I.D.

Overview

History 
In Common's song "I Used to Love H.E.R.", the rapper partially blamed hip hop's change from pro-black music to street music on its domination by West Coast Gangsta rap. In particular, the line "I wasn't salty: she was with the boys in the hood" alluded to the film Boyz n the Hood (set in South Central, Los Angeles), a movie starring Ice Cube. This caused Ice Cube and his group to release the song "Westside Slaughterhouse", throwing jabs at Common, amongst other rappers from the East Coast. In turn, Common responded with "The Bitch in Yoo."

Content 
Over a beat produced by Pete Rock, Common responds to verbal attacks by Westside Connection and its lead rapper Ice Cube. He claims that Ice Cube has not released a "dope" album since AmeriKKKa's Most Wanted, that too many of Ice Cube's beats sample George Clinton songs, and that Cube took Common's lyrics from "I Used to Love H.E.R." out of context.

Samples 
The song contains a sample from "Light My Fire" as performed by Brian Auger's Oblivion Express. It also contains vocal samples of Raekwon from the track "Eye for a Eye (Your Beef Is Mines)" by Mobb Deep, and "Suspended in Time" by Group Home, as well as a scratched vocal sample from the song "A Bitch Iz A Bitch", by N.W.A. The end of the song incorporates a scratched vocal sample from the movie "The Five Heartbeats." The opening of the song is taken from the film "The Education of Sonny Carson" scene where a leader of The Hawks Gang proclaims their superiority over the rival Lords.

Track listing

A-side
 "The Bitch in Yoo (W/O Intro)" (3:46)
 "The Bitch in Yoo (W/ Intro Flip)" (4:00)
 "The Bitch in Yoo (Street Version)" (4:00)

B-side
 "The Real Weight" (3:55)
 "The Real Weight (Instrumental Version)" (3:55)
 "The Bitch in Yoo (Instrumental Version)" (3:46)

1996 singles
Common (rapper) songs
Diss tracks
Songs written by Common (rapper)
1996 songs
Relativity Records singles
Song recordings produced by Pete Rock
Songs written by Pete Rock